Culicoides picadoae is a species of Culicoides.

References

picadoae
Insects described in 2004